Colin Morton (born 1948) is a Canadian poet.

Personal life
Morton was born in Toronto, Ontario, but grew up in Calgary, Alberta and has worked as a teacher and editor.

His poetry and fiction have appeared in Descant, The Fiddlehead, Arc, Grain, The Malahat Review, Ascent, and The North American Review among many other publications. He was a member of the performance group First Draft which recorded, published, and performed some 40 times across Canada in the 1980s.  More recently, his poetry has explored aspects of world history.

In 1986 and again in 2001 he won the Archibald Lampman Award for poetry.  His book of poetry The Merzbook was inspired by the life and work of Kurt Schwitters, and was the basis for a dramatic production, The Cabbage of Paradise.  The sound-poem, Primiti Too Taa, based on Schwitters' Ursonate (Sonata in primitive sounds), was made into an animated short film by Ed Ackerman, featuring Morton's voice and a stop-motion animation of moving letters, made using a typewriter.  It received several awards, including a Bronze Apple.

His book The Hundred Cuts: Sitting Bull and the Major is a poetic documentary about the exile in Canada of Lakota chief Sitting Bull, and his relationship with Major James Walsh of the NWMP.

He lives in Ottawa, Ontario.

Selected bibliography
 
 
In Transit (1981),  http://capa.conncoll.edu/morton.tran.htm
This Won't Last Forever (1985),   http://capa.conncoll.edu/morton.last.htm
The Merzbook: Kurt Schwitters Poems (1987),   http://capa.conncoll.edu/morton.merzbook.html
How to Be Born Again (1982), 
Oceans Apart (1995),  (novel)
Coastlines of the Archipelago (2000), 
Dance, Misery (2003), 
The Cabbage of Paradise (2007), 
The Local Cluster (2008), 
The Hundred Cuts: Sitting Bull and the Major (2009), 
Winds and Strings (2013),

Edited
The Scream: First Draft, the third annual group show Ouroboros (1984),

References

External links
Poetry and fiction by Colin Morton
https://web.archive.org/web/20091007230844/http://www.poets.ca/linktext/direct/morton.htm
http://library.stmarytx.edu/pgpress/authors/colin_morton/index.html

1948 births
Living people
20th-century Canadian poets
Canadian male poets
Writers from Calgary
Writers from Ottawa
Writers from Toronto
20th-century Canadian male writers